William Howard Vincent "Hopper" Levett (25 January 1908 – 30 November 1995) was an English cricketer who played as a wicket-keeper for Kent County Cricket Club between 1930 and 1947.

Levett was born at Goudhurst in Kent and educated at Brighton College.  He played in one Test match in 1934. He was a gentleman farmer from an old Kentish family that owned hop farms. He died at Hastings in Sussex.

References

External links 

1908 births
1995 deaths
England Test cricketers
English cricketers
Kent cricketers
English farmers
People from Goudhurst
People educated at Brighton College
Marylebone Cricket Club cricketers
Minor Counties cricketers
Gentlemen cricketers
North v South cricketers
Presidents of Kent County Cricket Club
English cricketers of 1919 to 1945
H. D. G. Leveson Gower's XI cricketers
Wicket-keepers